James or Jim Johnston may refer to:

Politicians

James Johnston (Secretary of State) (1655–1737), Scottish Secretary of State
James William Johnston (1792–1873), Canadian politician and judge
James Johnston (MP) (1801–1841), MP for Stirling Burghs 1830–32
James Johnston (Upper Canada politician) (died 1849), Bytown businessman and politician
James Johnston (Australian politician) (1811–1896), businessman and politician in Victoria, Australia
James Johnston (New South Wales politician) (1854–1930), politician in New South Wales, Australia
James Johnston (Queensland politician), Member of the Queensland Legislative Assembly
James Johnston (Northern Ireland politician) (1849–1924), Member of the Senate of Northern Ireland
James Johnston (Irish senator), Member of Seanad Éireann 1938–48
James T. Johnston (1839–1904), U.S. Representative from Indiana
James Wellwood Johnston (1900–1958), British politician
James Johnston (socialist politician) (1846–1928), British co-operative and socialist activist
 James Roger Johnston (born 1930), politician in Victoria, Australia

Military
James Johnston (Royal Horse Guards officer) (1721–1795), British Army general
James Johnston (British Army officer, died 1797) (c. 1721–1797), British Army general
James Johnston (British Army medical officer) (1911–1988), British Army officer in the Royal Army Medical Corps
James D. Johnston, Confederate Navy Commander
James Johnston (Colonel) (1742–1805), American soldier and a member of the North Carolina Provincial Congress

Business
James Johnston (brewer) (1818–1891), South Australian brewer
James Johnston (merchant) (1720s–1800), Canadian merchant
James A. Johnston (1874–1954), warden at Alcatraz prison
James P. Johnston (1813–1879), California pioneer, built James Johnston House (Half Moon Bay, California)
James Robinson Johnston (1876–1915), Canadian lawyer and community leader

Scientists
James Finlay Weir Johnston (1796–1855), Scottish chemist
James T. Johnston (born 1997), Aeronautical Engineer
Jim Johnston (chemist) (born 1949), New Zealand chemist who won the 1998 Thomson Medal

Religion

James S. Johnston (1843–1924), Episcopal bishop in America
James Johnston (missionary) (1851–1921), British missionary, photographer and explorer
James Vann Johnston Jr. (born 1959), American Roman Catholic bishop
James Johnston (priest), Archdeacon of Gibraltar

Arts
Jim Johnston (composer) (born 1952), American composer of professional wrestling entrance themes
James Johnston (tenor) (1903–1991), Northern Irish opera singer
James Johnston (English musician) (born 1966), English alternative rock musician
James Johnston (Scottish musician) (born 1980), bassist of Biffy Clyro
Jamie Johnston (born 1989), Canadian actor
Jim Johnston (English musician), member of the Bristol band Monk & Canatella
James Johnston (Australian musician), (born 26 November 1990) Australian country artist

Sports
 James Johnston (baseball owner) (1895–1967), co-owner of the Washington Senators of the American League
 James Johnston (footballer, born 1866) (1866–1952), Scottish footballer for Abercorn and Scotland
 James Johnston (1900s footballer) (fl. 1900s), Scottish footballer for Third Lanark
 James Johnston (rugby union) (born 1986), Samoan rugby union player
 Jimmy Johnston (American football) (1917–1973), American football player

See also
Don Johnston (Donald James Johnston), former Canadian politician and the Secretary General of the OECD
James Johnstone (disambiguation)
James Johnson (disambiguation)
James Howard-Johnston (born 1942), English historian